Robert Titus (c. 1600 – c. 1670) was the first Titus immigrant from England to America and is the progenitor of many of the Tituses in America today.  After living 19 years in Brookline, Weymouth and Rehoboth, Titus was warned out of Massachusetts in 1654; and moved to Long Island.

Emigration
Robert Titus sailed from St. Katherine's, London, aboard the ship Hopewell on April 3, 1635, with his wife, Hannah, and two sons.  The family arrived in the Massachusetts Bay Colony port of Boston; and Robert was granted land in Muddy River, the present town of Brookline, Massachusetts. They lived in Brookline for two or three years and then moved to the town of Weymouth. Robert's land in Weymouth is described in the town records and is printed on page 274 of The History of Weymouth:

Banishment
Robert and his family belonged to the Church of Weymouth where Rev. Samuel Newman was pastor from 1639 to 1643. In 1643 Rev. Newman and most of his parishioners, including the Titus family, moved out of Weymouth and settled to the southwest and ultimately founded Rehoboth, Massachusetts.

Despite Robert's importance in Rehoboth community, he began to have problems with his fellow townsmen.  On June 6, 1654, he was told to move his family out of the Plymouth Colony for allowing Abner Ordway and family, "persons of evil fame", to live in his home.  The practice of banishing a family from the colony was known as a "Warning Out Notice;" and the warning out of the Titus family was the first recorded in the Plymouth Colony Record (22. p. 52)

Robert took his family to Long Island in the summer of 1654 where his son Edmond had moved about 1650 to later become a Quaker. They settled near Oyster Bay in Huntington, Long Island.  Robert's oldest son John was a land holder in Rehoboth in 1654 and remained there when his father moved to Long Island.

Death
Robert Titus probably died before 1679 when his wife Hannah's will was read. The following will of Hannah Titus made at Huntington, L.I. in 1672 makes no mention of her husband. The original is on file in the office of the Clerk of the Court of Appeals, in Albany, N.Y.:

References

External links
New England Ships Passenger Lists, The Hopewell 1635

People of colonial Massachusetts
People from Brookline, Massachusetts
Year of birth uncertain